Michele Vallisneri (born July 15, 1973) is an Italian physicist, currently at Jet Propulsion Laboratory, California Institute of Technology and an Elected Fellow of the American Physical Society.

He received his Ph.D. degree from the California Institute of Technology in 2002, with a doctoral thesis on "Modeling and detecting gravitational waves from compact stellar objects," under the supervision of relativist Kip Thorne.
In 2017 he was awarded the NASA Exceptional Scientific Achievement Medal for "outstanding contributions to ground- and space-based detection of gravitational waves, critical to the nascent field of observational gravitational-wave astronomy."

Notes

External links

Living people
California Institute of Technology faculty
Fellows of the American Physical Society
21st-century Italian physicists
1973 births